Abū Zakarīyā’ Yaḥyá ibn ʿAdī (John, father of Zachary, son of Adi) known as Yahya ibn Adi (893–974) was a Syriac Jacobite Christian philosopher, theologian and translator working in Arabic.

Biography
Yahya ibn Adi was born in Tikrit (modern-day Iraq) to a family of Syriac Jacobite Christians in 893.

In Baghdad he studied philosophy and medicine under Abu Bishr Matta ibn Yunus, who had also taught Al-Farabi.

He translated numerous works of Greek philosophy into Arabic, mostly from existing versions in Syriac. These include: Plato's Laws; Aristotle's Sophistical Refutations (from a Syriac translation by Theophilus of Edessa) and Topics (from a translation by Hunayn ibn Ishaq); and Theophrastus' Metaphysics.

He also composed a number of philosophical and theological treatises, the most significant being Tahdhib al-akhlaq and Maqala fi at-tawhid. He taught a number of Christian and Muslim students, including Ibn Miskawayh, Ibn al-Khammar and Ibn Zura. Ibn Zura made Arabic translations of Aristotle and other Greek writers from Syriac.

He died in 974 and is buried in the Syriac church of St Thomas in Baghdad.

References

External links 
Works by Yahya ibn Adi
 Défense du dogme de la Trinité contre les objections d'Al-Kindi texte arabe de Ben Adi, traduction de Augustin Périer, in: Revue de l'Orient Chrétien 1920
 Petits traités apologétiques de Yahya ben Adi, texte arabe, traduction française de 9 traités par Augustin Périer, 1920
On our saying “and became incarnate of the Holy Spirit and the Virgin Mary” originally published by Paul Sbath, 1929
On the Truth of the Gospel by Way of Reasoning from Proofs originally published by Paul Sbath, 1929
On the Differences in the Expressions in the Gospels and their Meanings originally published by Paul Sbath, 1929
 Twelve Apologetic Treatiese by Yahya ibn Adi Arabic manuscript, BNF

Works on Yahya ibn Adi
 Yahya ben 'Adî, un philosophe arabe chrétien du Xe siècle par Augustin Périer, 1920
 Les citations bibliques chez Yahya Ibn Adi par Monseigneur Paul Feghali
 Le traité sur l'unité de Yahya Ibn Adi et la troisième maqalah de la métaphysique du kitab al-sifa d'Avicenne : deux finalités différentes dans l'analyse de l'Un  par Olga Lizzini, Parole de l'Orient, 2003
 L'homme parfait dans le traité d'éthique de Yahya Ibn Adi  par Samih Raad, Parole de l'Orient, 2003
The trinitarian doctrine of Yahya Ibn Adi: an appraisal  by Avril Makhlouf, Parole de l'Orient, 1981
Yahya Ibn Adi's conception of the one  by Kamal Bualwan, Parole de l'Orient, 2003.

10th-century philosophers
Aristotelian philosophers
Christian philosophers
Syriac–Arabic translators
Syriac Orthodox Christians
People from Tikrit
Iraqi Christians